Pickled eggs are typically hard boiled eggs that are cured in vinegar or brine. As with many foods, this was originally a way to preserve the food so that it could be eaten months later. Pickled eggs have since become a favorite among many as a snack or hors d'œuvre popular in pubs, bars and taverns, and around the world in places where beer is served.

After the eggs are hard boiled, the shell is removed and they are submerged in a solution of vinegar, salt, spices, and other seasonings. Recipes vary from the traditional brine solution for pickles, to other solutions, which can impart a sweet or spicy taste.

The final taste is mostly determined by the pickling solution. The eggs are left in this solution from one day to several months.  Prolonged exposure to the pickling solution may result in a rubbery texture. A common practice is to puncture the egg with a toothpick to allow the pickling solution to penetrate to the egg's interior, but this is dangerous as it can introduce clostridium into the finished product. Eggs prepared with this method have sometimes had high enough levels of botulinum toxin to cause illness in a human.

Pickled eggs may be served as part of a main course, hors d'œuvres, or garnishes.

Recipes
A variant historically associated with the Pennsylvania Dutch is the pickled beet egg where whole beets, onions, vinegar, sugar, salt, cloves, and (optionally) a cinnamon stick are used as the brine. The eggs take on a pink or even purple color from the beets and have a sweet and sour taste. Pickled red-beet eggs, long a common food at picnics and pot-lucks in the Pennsylvania Dutch country, have diffused into the folk cuisine of the surrounding "English" and become a popular snack that can be bought in supermarkets as far east as the Delaware River.

A typical British recipe for pickled eggs includes eggs, vinegar, salt and sugar. The eggs are then boiled, peeled, then boiled with the other ingredients. They last for three to four months (for best quality) and are traditionally found in British public houses and fish and chip shops.

History

Germany 
In Germany, pickled eggs were made and eaten by German immigrants in the mid-1700s, especially the Hessian mercenaries fighting against the Colonists in the Revolutionary War.

United States 
In Pennsylvania, the Pennsylvania Dutch created the pickled beet egg, where beets were added to the recipe turning the eggs into a pinkish color. The beet adds a contrast in flavor creating both a sweet and sour taste. In the 1940s, pickled eggs became very popular, as they were advertised in newspapers as lollipops, and wives were encouraged to make them on a skewer as a creative appetizer.

In November 1959, Hingham and Gibbsville students held a celebrated Veterans Day within their area. Larry Shaver dressed up as Mr. H.D Hyde, to honor him as the leader of Hingham’s egg industry while shipping over 10 rail carloads of pickled eggs at one time. Pickled eggs were popular around Easter as an added way to celebrate the season. Today, pretzels and chips are a more common snack for a restaurant and bars, but pickled eggs are still found in rural locations in the United States presented in a jar at some bars.

Ways to serve pickled eggs
The traditional method of eating pickled eggs is with salt and pepper. People will often add food coloring to the solution so that they are more festive and fun. They are also commonly eaten on avocado toast as well as in an egg salad. Pickled eggs can be served wherever hard-boiled eggs are served. For example, you could use them to make pickled deviled eggs as well as to grate them over asparagus or salads.

See also

References

External links 

Pickled Eggs (National Center for Home Food Preservation)
Tips To Make Hard Boiled Eggs (Complete Guide)

Christmas Island cuisine
Cuisine of the Midwestern United States
Danish cuisine
Egg dishes
English cuisine
German cuisine
Pennsylvania Dutch cuisine
Egg